Abramson School can refer to:
 Abramson Science and Technology Charter School, a charter school in New Orleans, Louisiana
 Marion Abramson High School, a former high school in New Orleans, Louisiana, in the location of the current Abramson Science and Technology Charter School